Olla Ramlan Tissa (born 15 February 1980), better known as Olla Ramlan, is an Indonesian presenter, model, TV personality and socialite.

Career 
Ramlan started her career as an event finalist selection Mode Cover Girl in 2007 after her sister Lolita submitted an entry form for her. She soon received offers to appear in soap operas and ad campaigns.

She appeared in the soap opera Shakila, and in a coffee commercial whose lines are still remembered as Pagi Donna.

In November 2010, she was appointed as brand ambassador for Yahoo OMG!

Family 
Olla Ramlan is the sixth child of 11 siblings.

Olla Ramlan officially divorced with her husband Alex Tian in October 2010.

Film 
 Suami-Suami Takut Istri the Movie (2008)
 Sakral'' (2018)

Sinetron/dramas 
 Shakila
 Perempuan
 Cinta Indah
 OKB
 Mata Air Surga
 Nada Cinta

Video clips 
 Volume Band – Hey Cantik
 Mulan Jameela Feat Mitha The Virgin – Cinta Mati 2
 Olga Syahputra – Jangan Ganggu Aku Lagi
 Ilovu – Pacar 3

Single 
 Gotcha (Feat Robin Hood)
 Sakit Hati
 Stop (Feat Dewi Sandra)

TV host 
 Dahsyat (RCTI)

Advertisement 
 Nescafé
 Yahoo
 Sharp
 Magnum

References

External links 
 Profil di Kroscek
 Profil di Yahoo OMG
 Twitter Olla Ramlan

Living people
1980 births
Indonesian female models
Indonesian television actresses
20th-century Indonesian women singers
Indonesian socialites
People from Banjarmasin
Indonesian women television presenters